This is a list of the wool, cotton and other textile mills in Dewsbury, Kirklees, West Yorkshire

Dewsbury

Soothill

Thornhill (Dewsbury)

Warehouses

See also
Heavy Woollen District
Textile processing

References

Footnotes

The National Monument Record is a legacy numbering system maintained by English Heritage. Further details on each mill may be obtained from this url. http://yorkshire.u08.eu/

Notes

Bibliography

External links

Dew
Dewsbury
Dewsbury
Dewsbury
History of the textile industry
Industrial Revolution in England
Buildings and structures in Dewsbury